The 1987 Cedok Open, also known as the Prague Open was a men's tennis tournament played on outdoor clay courts at the I. Czech Lawn Tennis Club in Prague, Czechoslovakia that was part of the 1987 Grand Prix circuit. It was the inaugural edition of the tournament and was held from 10 August until 16 August 1987. Fourth-seeded Marián Vajda won the singles title.

Finals

Singles
 Marián Vajda defeated  Tomáš Šmíd 3–6, 6–3, 6–3
 It was Vajda's first singles title of his career.

Doubles
 Miloslav Mečíř /  Tomáš Šmíd defeated  Stanislav Birner /  Jaroslav Navrátil 6–3, 6–7, 6–3

References

External links
 ITF tournament edition details

Cedok Open
Prague Open (1987–1999)
Cedok Open